The 2011 KBS Drama Awards, is a ceremony honoring the outstanding achievement in television on the Korean Broadcasting System (KBS) network for the year of 2011. It was held on December 31, 2011 and hosted by actress Han Hye-jin, actor Joo Won, and anchorman Jun Hyun-moo.

Nominations and winners
(Winners denoted in bold)

References

External links
http://www.kbs.co.kr/drama/2011award/

KBS Drama Awards
KBS Drama Awards
KBS Drama Awards